Izernore is a commune in the Ain department in eastern France. An ancient Roman bronze hoard consisting of a patera and an oval dish was found in Izernore in 1845 and is now in the British Museum's collection.

Population

Personalities
It was the birthplace of St. Eugendus (born c. 449).

See also
Communes of the Ain department

References

Communes of Ain
Ain communes articles needing translation from French Wikipedia